Roy Everett Tillotson (April 1, 1891 – August 30, 1962) was an American coach and athletic trainer who coached at Hiram College in Hiram, Ohio, Miami University in Oxford, Ohio, Franklin College in Franklin, Indiana, and the University of Toledo.

Tillotson was born in Oberlin, Ohio, where he graduated from Oberlin High School in 1910 and Oberlin College in 1916. He later earned an M.S. degree at Indiana University.

After teaching physical education and coaching at Allegheny High School in Pittsburgh for four years, he became a coach at Hiram College in 1920. He was head basketball coach at Miami University from 1924 until 1930, when he began a 19-year career at Franklin College. He became equipment manager and trainer at the University of Toledo in 1950, retiring the year before his death.

Tillotson died on August 30, 1962, at St. Catherine Hospital in East Chicago, Indiana, after suffering a heart attack. He and is buried alongside his wife, Mabelle, at Greenlawn Cemetery in Franklin, Indiana.

Head coaching record

College football

References

External links
 

1891 births
1962 deaths
American football tackles
Basketball coaches from Ohio
Franklin Grizzlies athletic directors
Franklin Grizzlies baseball coaches
Franklin Grizzlies football coaches
Franklin Grizzlies men's basketball coaches
Hiram Terriers baseball coaches
Hiram Terriers football coaches
Hiram Terriers men's basketball coaches
Miami RedHawks football coaches
Miami RedHawks men's basketball coaches
Oberlin Yeomen football players
Indiana University alumni
People from Oberlin, Ohio
Players of American football from Ohio